The HP 4xx family of Designjet plotters was made to enable the printing of large-format 24" to 36-inch wide monochrome or color plotting of technical documents and color photographs.  HP no longer supports this plotter.

HP DesignJet 450c Technical specifications
This is an inkjet plotter.
It uses three inkjet cartridges: # 44 Cyan / magenta / Yellow (51644 C/M/Y), #40 Black (51640A).
Its black-and-white printing resolution is 600 dpi while its color resolution is 300 dpi.
Width: 132 cm; Depth : 23 cm; Height: 33 cm. Weight: 31 kg.

References

HP plotters
Ink plotters